Daniel Smith (born 16 March 1992) is a Filipino-Australian cricketer who plays for the Philippines cricket team. He currently is a practicing Lawyer in New South Wales.  He holds Philippines citizenship through his Filipino mother. He has also played first-grade cricket for Gordon District Cricket Club in the NSW Premier Cricket competition.

In March 2019, he was named in the Philippines squad for the Regional Finals of the 2018–19 ICC T20 World Cup East Asia-Pacific Qualifier tournament. He made his Twenty20 International (T20I) debut for the Philippines against Papua New Guinea on 22 March 2019.

In February 2022, he was named the vice-captain of the Philippines' team for the 2022 ICC Men's T20 World Cup Global Qualifier A tournament in Oman.

References

External links
 

1992 births
Living people
Australian people of Filipino descent
Sportspeople of Filipino descent
Filipino cricketers
Philippines Twenty20 International cricketers
Place of birth missing (living people)